Scott Harvey Peters (born June 17, 1958) is an American lawyer and politician serving as the U.S. representative from California's 50th congressional district since 2023, previously representing the 52nd congressional district from 2013 to 2023. His district includes both coastal and central portions of San Diego, as well as the suburbs of Poway and Coronado.

A member of the Democratic Party, Peters served two terms on the San Diego City Council from 2000 to 2008, and was the first person to hold the post of president of the city council (2006–2008). He also served as a commissioner for the Unified Port of San Diego before becoming a member of Congress.

Early life, education, and legal career
Peters was born in 1958 in Springfield, Ohio. He was raised in Michigan. His father was a Lutheran minister and his mother was a homemaker. Peters has said that he took out student loans and participated in his school's work-study program, through which he was given jobs answering phones and cleaning pigeon cages. He received his undergraduate degree from Duke University.

Peters served as an economist on the staff of the U.S. Environmental Protection Agency (EPA), then earned a J.D. degree from the New York University School of Law. Before his election to the city council, he worked as a deputy county counsel for San Diego County and as an attorney in private practice focusing on environmental law. He gained notability in a lawsuit against a local shipbuilder.

California government career

California Coastal Commission
In 2002, Peters was appointed to the California Coastal Commission. He served one three-year term on the Commission. A coalition of environmental groups gave his votes an environmental score of 31% in 2002, 52% in 2003 and 40% in 2004. He was "involuntarily retired" in 2005 when new State Assembly Speaker Fabian Nunez did not renew his appointment.

City Council (2000–2008)

Elections
In 2000, Peters ran for the San Diego City Council's 1st district. In the open primary, he ranked second with 24% of the vote, qualifying for the November general election. Businesswoman Linda Davis ranked first with 32% of the vote. Peters defeated Davis, 53%-47%.

In the 2004 open primary, he came in first with 48% of the vote. Businessman Phil Thalheimer ranked second with 31% of the vote. In the November election, Peters was reelected, defeating Thalheimer 55%-45%.

Tenure
In 2004, San Diego city residents voted to change the structure of city government from a council-city manager form to a mayor-council form, which made the mayor the city's chief executive officer. Serving as a member of the city council during this time, Peters was elected to chair the transition committee in charge of this project.

In 2005, Peters's fellow council members elected him to serve as the first president of the San Diego City Council, which under the new form of government made him the chief officer of the city's newly defined legislative branch. In 2008, San Diego's mayor vetoed a 24% pay raise for the city council that Peters and four other council members had voted for.

Peters was a member of the San Diego City Council during the San Diego pension scandal. In 2002, he voted with the majority to underfund the employee pension system. The ensuing Securities and Exchange Commission investigation cleared Peters and the other council members of fraud, but the Kroll Report investigation called them "negligent." The city spent $7 million defending officials involved in this case, including $631,000 defending Peters. During the 2012 congressional election campaign, his Republican opponent, Brian Bilbray, made the scandal a major issue.

In 2007, Peters was criticized for excessive water use during a drought. He ended the year having consumed more than 1 million gallons of water for his home, which sits on a 34,848-square-foot lot near Mount Soledad, and for an adjacent landscaped parcel.

Peters cited a reduction in sewer spills and beach closure days as accomplishments during his city council tenure. He stated that the city averaged one spill per day when he was elected in 2000, but that the incidence of such spills fell 80% during his terms in office. He was involved in the push to ban alcohol from the city's beaches, as well as to ban smoking from public beaches and parks.

2008 city attorney election
Having reached the end of his eight-year term limit on the city council, Peters ran for San Diego City Attorney in 2008, challenging incumbent City Attorney Mike Aguirre. In the open primary, state legislator Jan Goldsmith ranked first with 32% of the vote. The incumbent ranked second with 29% of the vote, qualifying for the runoff election. Peters ranked third with 20% of the vote and did not advance to the runoff. He later served as deputy county counsel for the County of San Diego.

Port Commission (2009–2012)

Peters was a port commissioner from 2009 through 2012, serving as chair of the Port Commission in 2011. He was sworn in as a commissioner in January 2009, after having been appointed by the San Diego City Council. He represented the City of San Diego on the Port Commission, making decisions about the uses of San Diego Bay and its adjacent waterfront land.

Peters's fellow commissioners chose him to serve as chair of the board of commissioners for 2011. In January 2011, he said one of his top priorities was to decommission the South Bay Power Plant in Chula Vista to make room for better use. In the year Peters served as chair, the board of commissioners reached a deal with the former operator of the plant for its demolition. The Port also conducted community outreach for six months to gather ideas for improving San Diego's waterfront "front porch" between the airport and Seaport Village.

U.S. House of Representatives (2013–present)

Elections

2012 

Peters ran for the newly redrawn 52nd district in 2012. The district had previously been the 50th district, represented by Republican incumbent Brian Bilbray. In the final month of the race, Peters lent $1.25 million to his own campaign. In the open primary, Bilbray ranked first with 41% of the vote. Peters ranked second with 23% of the vote, qualifying for the November general election ballot. He narrowly edged out State Assemblywoman Lori Saldaña, a fellow Democrat, who earned 22% of the vote. The other candidates all received single-digit percentages. During the primary, Peters received the endorsement of retiring congressman Bob Filner of the neighboring 51st district. On election night the vote was too close to call, but Peters's small lead increased each day as more absentee, vote-by-mail, and provisional ballots were processed. On November 16, Bilbray conceded to Peters. Peters defeated Bilbray 51%-49%, a difference of 6,956 votes. He became the first Democrat to represent what is now the 52nd since 1991, when Jim Bates was unseated in what was then the 44th district (it was renumbered the 51st in 1993 and the 50th in 2003).

2014 

In the June 2014 primary, Peters was opposed by three Republicans. Peters was the top vote-getter with 42%. Under California's "top two" primary system, he faced the second-place finisher, former city councilman Carl DeMaio, in the November general election. Peters was a member of the Democratic Congressional Campaign Committee's Frontline Program. The program is designed to help protect vulnerable Democratic candidates. In August, Peters was endorsed by the United States Chamber of Commerce, which usually endorses Republicans. Peters was supported by 100 PACs that had supported the Republican incumbent, Brian Bilbray, in the previous cycle.

In a poll conducted by SurveyUSA for U-T San Diego and 10News during September 11–15, 2014, Peters polled at 47% and DeMaio at 46%. The same poll taken October 2–6 showed DeMaio with a 3-point lead over Peters, within the margin of error. An earlier Survey USA poll showed Peters leading by one point.

On election night the result was too close to call, with DeMaio ahead by 751 votes. Over the next few days Peters pulled into the lead. By Friday, Peters had a lead of 4,491 votes, and the Associated Press called the election for him. The final result was Peters 51.59% and DeMaio 48.41%.

2016 

Peters was re-elected in 2016 with 56.5% of the vote, handily defeating Republican Denise Gitsham.

2018 

Peters was reelected with 63.8% of the vote over Republican Omar Qudrat.

2020 

Peters was reelected with 61.6% of the vote over Republican Jim DeBello.

Tenure
Peters supported reauthorizing the Violence Against Women Act in early 2013. In April of that year, he voted for the Cyber Intelligence Sharing and Protection Act, a bill that would allow federal intelligence agencies to share cybersecurity intelligence and information with private entities and utilities. Peters co-sponsored the BREATHE Act in March 2013. In May, he voted against repeal of the Patient Protection and Affordable Care Act (PPACA). The same year, he co-sponsored the Student Non-Discrimination Act. In October 2013, Peters was one of nine Democratic co-sponsors of HR3425, an unsuccessful proposal to delay any penalties under the PPACA until four months after the program's website was fully functional. As of late 2013, Peters had voted the same way as Republican Speaker of the House John Boehner nine of the 16 times that Boehner had cast a vote.

In 2014, the U.S. Chamber of Commerce, a Republican-affiliated lobbying group, said Peters voted with the Chamber's position on key bills 69% of the time. Also in 2014, Peters said he would prefer that Congress develop a strategy to deal with climate change, but that in lieu of congressional action, he would support President Obama's moves to bypass Congress and look for an international climate change deal.

Peters signed the Respect for Marriage Act in early 2015. Months later, the Supreme Court decided Obergefell v. Hodges, making the act de facto federal law.

Peters co-sponsored the Safe Drinking Water Act Improved Compliance Awareness Act, which would have required lead in drinking water to be reported to the public. In June 2016, House Democrats staged a sit-in on the House floor to protest the lack of a vote on gun control. The Speaker pro tem, Ted Poe, declared the House was in recess, and the video feed to C-SPAN was shut off. But after a brief interruption, C-SPAN was able to broadcast the sit-in because Peters streamed the activity using his Periscope account. That same month, Peters voted in support of the DARK Act.

In 2019, Peters sponsored the bipartisan Super Pollutants Act, which according to a press release from his office "aims to slow climate change by regulating black carbon, hydrofluorocarbons, and methane–some of the most potent greenhouse gases. These short-lived climate pollutants, also called super pollutants, are significantly more potent than carbon dioxide."

In 2021, Peters voted against moving forward with the Build Back Better Act, leading to protest from environmentalist and progressive groups.

Committee assignments

2013–2014 113th session of Congress
 Committee on Armed Services
 Subcommittee on Seapower and Projection Forces
 Subcommittee on Intelligence, Emerging Threats and Capabilities
 Committee on Science, Space and Technology
 Subcommittee on Oversight
 Subcommittee on Technology

2015–2016 114th session of Congress

Committee on Armed Services
Subcommittee on Seapower and Projection Forces
Subcommittee on Readiness
United States House Judiciary Committee
Subcommittee on Courts, Intellectual Property, and the Internet
Subcommittee on Regulatory Reform, Commercial and Antitrust Law

2017–2018 115th session of Congress

Committee on Energy and Commerce
Subcommittee on Energy
Subcommittee on Environment
Subcommittee on Oversight and Investigations
Committee on Veterans' Affairs
Subcommittee on Oversight and Investigations
Subcommittee on Technology Modernization
2019–2020 116th session of Congress
Committee on Energy and Commerce
Subcommittee on Energy
Subcommittee on Oversight and Investigations
Committee on the Budget
2021–2022 117th session of Congress
Committee on Energy and Commerce
Committee on Small Business

Caucus memberships
 House Democratic Caucus
 New Democrat Coalition
 Problem Solvers Caucus
 Congressional Arts Caucus
 Congressional Asian Pacific American Caucus
 United States Congressional International Conservation Caucus
 Climate Solutions Caucus
 U.S.-Japan Caucus

Political positions
Peters is a relatively conservative Democrat. He is vice-chair of the centrist New Democrat Coalition. A 2016 analysis found that Peters was among the House members "most likely to vote against his fellow party members." He was quoted saying "I’m proud of my independent record." Peters endorsed Michael Bloomberg's 2020 presidential campaign, saying that "we need an alternative to Sen. Sanders and Sen. Warren... I disagree with them more on policy."

Abortion

Peters is pro-choice. He has a 100% rating from NARAL Pro-Choice America and an F rating from the Susan B. Anthony List for his abortion-related voting record. He opposed the overturning of Roe v. Wade.

Civil rights

LGBTQ+
Peters supports same-sex marriage.

Women's rights
His efforts to support women's rights earned him an endorsement from the Feminist Majority in 2012.

Climate change

Peters supports bipartisan climate action. Peters has called climate change "a global emergency and imminent threat that requires us to work across party lines to take bold, immediate action."  He supports efforts to decarbonize the economy to become net-zero carbon, including charging for carbon expenditures. He also wants to regulate methane, hydrofluorocarbons and black carbon, which he believes contribute to climate change. Peters also wants to see the auto industry transition to electric vehicles.

Wildfires
Peters acknowledges that wildfires have increased due to climate change. He considers wildfires, and natural disasters, high priority in his district. He has sponsored legislation to ensure transparency in government spending on disaster responses. He also has supported the Wildfire Disaster Funding Act to fund wildfire suppression and prevention efforts.

COVID-19

Peters called the Trump administration's response to COVID-19 "abysmal" and said that "other countries look on with a mixture of horror and pity for how this has gone for us.” He pushed to oppose a patent waiver that would allow developing nations to create their own vaccines.

Energy and oil

Peters opposes expanding offshore drilling and has supported efforts to ban it in the Gulf of Mexico. He supports nuclear energy and investing in advanced nuclear technologies.

Government reform

Peters supports D.C. statehood.

Voting rights

Peters opposes requiring photo ID to vote. He supports automatic voter registration for eligible voters and making election day a federal holiday.

Guns

Peters supports background check requirements for every firearm sale and transfer.

Health care

He supports the Affordable Care Act and opposes efforts to repeal it.

In 2019, Peters supported a bill to lower drug costs, but in 2021, he played a leading role in preventing its passage. Peters was one of three Democrats on the House Energy Committee to oppose allowing Medicare to negotiate drug prices, except in a small subset of cases. In September 2021, he and Representatives Kurt Schrader and Kathleen Rice joined Republican members to block committee passage of such a bill, 29-29. Peters appeared to be the leader of the opposition group. Peters has received consistent and considerable financial support from the pharmaceutical industry since he was first elected in 2012. Over his career, pharmaceutical PACs and employees have donated $860,465 to his campaigns, the second-most of any industry, according to Open Secrets. By mid-September in the 2022 election cycle, pharmaceutical industry contributions to Peters exceeded those of all other House members and candidates at $88,550.

Housing

Peters considers housing and homelessness top concerns in his district. He supports affordable housing and building dense housing near transit, with the goal of getting more homes being built while improving transit infrastructure.

Immigration

Peters supports the DREAM Act and creating paths to citizenship for longtime immigrant U.S. residents. He opposed the Trump administration family separation policy. Peters co-sponsored the Providing Justice for Asylum Seekers Act to make it easier for immigration judges to reschedule cases to avoid automatic deportation of people seeking asylum.

Military

Peters has led efforts to improve infrastructure at Marine Corps Air Station Miramar. He has encouraged the building of new Navy ships based in San Diego. He supports a new Navy SEALs training facility in the San Diego area.

Police

Peters co-sponsored the Justice in Policing Act. He believes in partnering with law enforcement officers "to change the culture."

U.S.-Mexico relations

Peters considers the border relations between San Diego and Mexico one of his district's top priorities. He opposed the Trump wall and supports the USMCA. He has led efforts to upgrade the San Ysidro Port of Entry to reduce border waits. He also supports modernizing border security.

Big Tech
In 2022, Peters was one of 16 Democrats to vote against the Merger Filing Fee Modernization Act of 2022, an antitrust package that would crack down on corporations for anti-competitive behavior.

Personal life
Peters lives with his family in La Jolla. He and his wife, Lynn E. Gorguze, have two children. Gorguze is president and CEO of Cameron Holdings, and his family has a net worth of $112 million. As of 2014, Peters was the sixth-wealthiest member of Congress.

Electoral history

2012

2014

2016

2018

2020

References

External links

 Congressman Scott Peters official U.S. House website
 Scott Peters for Congress campaign website
 
 

|-

|-

|-

1958 births
21st-century American politicians
Duke University alumni
Living people
Democratic Party members of the United States House of Representatives from California
New York University School of Law alumni
Politicians from Springfield, Ohio
San Diego City Council members